Narayan Shankar Pawar  (born 1 August 1963) is an Indian politician and a current member of Thane Municipal Corporation Standing committee. He was elected to the Standing committee as an Indian National Congress candidate in Jan 2012 general election.

References

External links

Marathi politicians
Maharashtra politicians
Living people
1963 births
Indian National Congress politicians
Bharatiya Janata Party politicians from Maharashtra